Johan Henrik Andresen or Johan H. Andresen may refer to:

Johan Henrik Andresen (1815–1874), Norwegian merchant, factory owner
Johan H. Andresen (1888–1953), Norwegian industrialist and politician, grandson of above
Johan Henrik Andresen (1930–2011), Norwegian businessman, son of above
Johan H. Andresen Jr. (born 1961), Norwegian businessman, son of above